"Judy in Disguise (With Glasses)" is a song that was a hit for the Louisiana-based John Fred & His Playboy Band in late 1967. It was jointly composed by Fred and bandmate Andrew Bernard.

Arrangements and content
The song features strings, brass, a sitar, piano, bass, guitar, drums, breathing sounds, and dissonant string sounds. Its title is a play on, and a mondegreen of, the Beatles song "Lucy in the Sky with Diamonds". (Fred thought the lyrics were "Lucy in disguise with diamonds" when he first heard that song.)

The other members of the Playboy Band did not like the unusual slow abrupt ending with Fred intoning the final line, "I guess I'll just take your glasses."

Chart performance
In January 1968, the song reached #1 in the US and became a gold record. It also hit #1 in Germany, Switzerland, and Australia, and #3 in both Canada and the United Kingdom.

Weekly charts

Year-end charts

See also

List of number-one hits of 1968 (Germany)
List of number-one hits of 1968 (Switzerland)
List of Hot 100 number-one singles of 1968 (U.S.)
List of 1960s one-hit wonders in the United States

References

1967 singles
Gary Lewis & the Playboys songs
Billboard Hot 100 number-one singles
Cashbox number-one singles
Number-one singles in Australia
Number-one singles in Germany
Number-one singles in South Africa
Number-one singles in Switzerland
1967 songs
Mondegreens
Songs written by John Fred